Here Is... is the debut album from the Los Angeles alternative rock band Gosling.

Track listing 

 "Intro" - 0:44
 "Mr. Skeleton Wings" - 4:14
 "Worm Waltz" - 4:01
 "Half Awake" - 4:21
 "The Burnout" - 4:35
 "Come into My Room" - 5:02
 "Stealing Stars" - 3:33
 "Waiting for the Sun" - 4:24
 "Glass Is Empty" - 3:03
 "Afraid of Nineveh" - 2:01
 "One Hand Two Hand" - 3:30
 "Here Is..." - 5:40
 "Sinking Ship" - 5:39

Credits
 Davey Ingersoll - Vocal, Guitar
 Mark Watrous - Guitar, Keyboard, Vocal
 Shane Middleton - Bass Guitar
 Isaac Carpenter - Drums, Vocal

Trivia
The title is taken from a scene in Taxi Driver.

Gosling (band) albums
2006 albums
V2 Records albums